The 1876 Cincinnati Reds season was a season in American baseball. It was the team's first season of existence, having been formed as part of the brand new National League in 1876. This team was not related (except by name) to the previous Cincinnati Red Stockings National Association team, which had folded in 1870.

Regular season
One bright spot for the Reds was the play of Charley Jones, who led the club with a batting average of .286, had the second highest home run total in the league with four, and was among the league leaders in doubles and slugging percentage.

Season summary 
The Reds played their first ever game on April 25, 1876, defeating the St. Louis Brown Stockings 2–1 at Avenue Grounds. Wins would be few and far between for the Reds, as after putting up a solid 3–2 record in their opening five games, the Reds would go on an eleven-game losing streak to fall to 3–13. After defeating the Hartford Dark Blues 8–2 to end their losing streak, the Reds would then have a thirteen-game losing streak, and saw their record fall to 4–26. By the time the season was finished, Cincinnati had the worst record in the National League, as they ended the season with a 9–56 record, 42.5 games behind the first place Chicago White Stockings.

Season standings

Record vs. opponents

Roster

Player stats

Batting

Starters by position
Note: Pos = Position; G = Games played; AB = At bats; H = Hits; Avg. = Batting average; HR = Home runs; RBI = Runs batted in

Other batters
Note: G = Games played; AB = At bats; H = Hits; Avg. = Batting average; HR = Home runs; RBI = Runs batted in

Pitching

Starting pitchers
Note: G = Games pitched; IP = Innings pitched; W = Wins; L = Losses; ERA = Earned run average; SO = Strikeouts

Other pitchers
Note: G = Games pitched; IP = Innings pitched; W = Wins; L = Losses; ERA = Earned run average; SO = Strikeouts

Relief pitchers
Note: G = Games pitched; W = Wins; L = Losses; SV = Saves; ERA = Earned run average; SO = Strikeouts

References

Cincinnati Reds (1876–1880) seasons
Cincinnati Reds season
Cincinnati